Topla may refer to:
Topla, Nadia a village of Nadia District, West Bengal ,  India
Topla, Črna na Koroškem, a village in the Municipality of Črna na Koroškem, northern Slovenia
Topla Landscape Park, a landscape park in northern Slovenia
Topla, a village in Bor District in Serbia
Topla monastery, near Herceg Novi, Montenegro
Topla, a village in Cornereva Commune, Caraș-Severin County, Romania
Topla, a village in Mănăștiur Commune, Timiș County, Romania
Topľa, river in eastern Slovakia
Topla (river), river in western Romania